Westford is the primary village and a census-designated place (CDP) in the town of Westford, Chittenden County, Vermont, United States. It was first listed as a CDP prior to the 2020 census.

The CDP is in northern Chittenden County, in the center of the town of Westford. The Browns River, a north-flowing tributary of the Lamoille River and part of the Lake Champlain watershed, passes through the CDP just east of the village center. Vermont Route 128 runs through Westford village, leading north  to Fairfax and south  to Essex Center.

References 

Populated places in Chittenden County, Vermont
Census-designated places in Chittenden County, Vermont
Census-designated places in Vermont